The 2015 Afghan Premier League Final was the final match of the 2015 Afghan Premier League, the 4th season of Afghanistan's premier club football tournament organised by Roshan.

The match took place on Friday, 2 October 2015, at the AFF Stadium in Kabul, Afghanistan, between Greater Kabul Region Shaheen Asmayee and Eastern region De Spin Ghar Bazan. It was the fourth tournament final since the establishment of Afghan Premier League. De Spin Ghar Bazan won the match 4–3 at the penalty shootout after extra time.

Venue
The Afghanistan Football Federation Stadium in Kabul, Afghanistan, was the venue of the 2015 Afghan Premier League Final for the fourth time.

The home stadium of all Afghan Premier League teams since its establishment, The stadium has a capacity of 5,000, and the surface is of Artificial turf.

Background
This was the first time in the history of De Spin Ghar Bazan that reached the final. It was also the third time for Shaheen Asmayee that reached the final, although having won two times. Shaheen Asmayee reached a record 3rd final after a 4–3 aggregate win against North Eastern region Mawjhai Amu, making it the first club that reached the final three times in a row.
Previously Shaheen Asmayee won finals in 2013 and 2014.

In the other side De Spin Ghar Bazan reached the final after 3 seasons waiting for the first time, after a 4–2 penalty shootout win against South West region De Maiwand Atalan.

Pre-match

Ticketing
Tickets were available in two price categories: 50 Afs, 100 Afs.

Referee
Halim Aqa Sherzad was chosen for judgement of the final match.

Road to the final

Match

Summary
The championship match between Shaheen Asmayee and De Spinghar Bazan kicked with a powerful start by Bazan, they blew past Shaheen's midfielders and dueled with their defensive line, threatening an early goal against Shaheen.

A long range strike by Shaheen's Samiullah at the 4th minute missed the goal but helped Shaheen swing by the momentum of the match in their favor. They soon took the fight back to Bazan's goal area and fired on the goal in the 6th minute but thanks to Bazan's goalie Zohaib ‘s agility and talent, he made a perfect save and kept Bazan in the game.

Supported by brilliant work from their midfielders, Shaheen's Hashmatullah  spent much of the first half relentlessly assaulting Bazan's goal area but again Zohaib Aseel revealed himself as special talent, stopping multiple shots on goal that would have bypassed a lesser goalie.

The second half ended in a scoreless stalemate between Shaheen and Bazazn but with Shaheen commanding the majority of the play throughout. The second half started with Shaheen's Hashmatullah again on the hunt for his first goal of the game and powerful header at the 54th minute mark almost lands but misses the goal by centimeters.

Bazan's midfield and defensive line seemed to come apart in the second half and Zohaib Aseel found himself hard pressed and again tested multiple times by the best strikers in the league. And Zohaib passes each test with flying colors, diving, deflecting and intercepting many difficult shots on goal by Shaheen's best. Thanks to his brilliant work at Bazan's net, the team rallies and by the 75th minute they began to increasingly threaten Shaheen's goal area. Bazan's Faqeer fires at the goal at the 78th minute but the shot goes wide followed by a narrow miss by his fellow forward Manan Farahi at the 79th With each side pointless by the end of the 90th minute the game moved into extra time.

Bazan's youthfulness as a team began to make a difference and Shaheen unexpectedly found themselves battling against a strong offensive lead by Bazan's young midfielders and forwards. Still, it was not enough to decide the game and a second extra time period had to be called. Shaheen took advantage of the next extra time period to press Bazan extremely hard, they were able to keep most of the play in Bazan's penalty area and it was only a mixture of fierce determination by Zohaib and the entire rest of the Bazan team that prevented them from scoring. The clock ran out on the second extra period with a score of 0 – 0 moving the game into the decisive penalty shoot out phase.

During the penalty shootout Bazan's Rohid Samandary, MananFarahi, Ghulam Niazi and Rishad Hassanzada scored 4 goals against Shaheen's 3 to win the 2015 RAPL championship via penalty shootout. It took many years full of hard work and heartbreak for De Spinghar Bazan to reach the summit of the RAPL but they never gave up and today, they preserved against odds to emerge as the 2015 Roshan Afghan Premier League champions!.

Details

Statistics

See also
 Afghan Premier League
 2015 Afghan Premier League

References

External links
 Official website

2015